Anyang University is a private university in Korea. Courses consist of undergraduate, graduate, doctoral and research programs. The main campus is  located in Anyang City, south of Seoul in Gyeonggi province and the second campus is located on Ganghwa Island, Incheon.  It has a student body of about 5,500.  It has colleges of Humanities, Social Sciences, Science & Engineering, Theological Studies, Music, and Liberal Arts & Sciences, and offers graduate programs in General Studies, Theology, Education, and Business Administration & Public Administration.

History
The school opened in 1948 as a theological college in Seoul.

When the campus moved from Seoul to Anyang in 1980s, the school expanded to Liberal Arts and, later, to engineering, technology, and business as well. With such expansion, the school changed its name to "DaeShin University" in 1990, and the current name was adopted in March 1995. Dr. Youngsil Kim became the first president of the university since its conversion to university system. He was succeeded by Dr. Seung Tae Kim. In June 2014, Dr. Suk-Joon Kim became the president of the university.

Schools and departments
Undergraduate
College of Humanities
College of Social Science
College of Engineering
College of Theology
College of Music
College of Liberal Arts & Science

Graduate
General Graduate School
Graduate School of Engineering
Graduate School of Theology
Graduate School of Education
Graduate School of Business & Public Administration

Departments
Business Administration
Chinese Language
Christian Culture
Christian Education
Computer Science & Engineering
Cosmetology
Digital Media Design
Digital Media Engineering
Early Childhood Education
Electrical & Electronic Engineering
English Linguistics & Literature
Environmental Engineering
Food Science & Nutrition
International Relations
Information & Communications Engineering
Information & Statistics
Korean Linguistics & Literature
Marine Biotechnology
Music (Composition, Instrumental Studies, Piano, Voice)
Performing Arts
Public Administration
Russian Language
Social Welfare
Theology
Tourism English Interpretation
Tourism Management
Trade & Distribution
Urban Administration
Urban Information Engineering

Resources and institutes
Subsidiary institutions
Academia-Industrial-Research Consortium Center
Anyang University Broadcasting Station(
Anyang University Newspaper (English & Korean)
Anyang University Medical Clinic
Business Incubation Center
Center for Teaching & Learning
Computing & Information Center
Illwoo Central Library
Office of International Relations
Student Human Resources Development Center
Student Life Counseling Center
Student Service Center

Research institutes
The Brightening One Corner Institute
CReDI Capital Regional Development Institute
The Institute of Humanities Science
The Institute of Social Sciences
The Center for Theological Research
The Institute for Welfare Administration
West Costal Area Development Institute

Auxiliary educational centers
Lifelong Education Center
Foreign Language Education Center
Wooli Children's Daycare Center

Scholarships
Anyang University offers scholarships for domestic and international students according to matriculation status, school and department affiliation, financial need, academic achievement, and grade point average from its funds, sponsors and research institutes.

Campuses
 Anyang Campus, 708-113, Anyang-5dong, Manan-gu, Anyang-si, Gyeonggi-do, Korea
 Ganghwa Campus, San102, Samsung-ri, Buleun-myeon, Ganwha-gun, Incheon, Korea

The Anyang Campus is on the Seoul Subway line no. 1 (blue line) at Anyang Station. There are several buses also.

See also

List of colleges and universities in South Korea
Education in South Korea

References

External links
University Website

 
Universities and colleges in Gyeonggi Province
Educational institutions established in 1948
1948 establishments in Korea